William Greyer Coop (February 26, 1805 – June 4, 1874) was a farmer and settler from Illinois and Iowa, who served as a colonel of the militia, a sheriff and a member of the legislatures of Iowa Territory and the State of Iowa. He was born in Greene County, Virginia, and successively lived in Tennessee, Washington County, Pennsylvania, Wabash County, Indiana, and Macoupin County, Illinois, where he was county sheriff, before moving to Iowa.

References 

1805 births
1874 deaths
Members of the Iowa Territorial Legislature
People from Macoupin County, Illinois
Members of the Iowa House of Representatives
Iowa state senators
19th-century American politicians
People from Greene County, Virginia
People from Wabash County, Indiana
People from Washington County, Pennsylvania
People from Henry County, Iowa
People from Jefferson County, Iowa
Illinois sheriffs